Tsuen Wan Road is a major expressway in Tsuen Wan and Kwai Tsing districts, New Territories, Hong Kong. It forms part of Route 5 of Hong Kong's highway system and runs 4.1 kilometers in the east-west direction from Kwai Chung Road near the Kwai Tsing Container Terminals to Tuen Mun Road at Chai Wan Kok. The speed limit of the road is at 70 kilometres per hour. It was opened to traffic in June 1981 and was fully completed in November 1985.

References

Tsuen Wan District
Kwai Tsing District
Extra areas operated by NT taxis
Route 5 (Hong Kong)
Roads in the New Territories